Forged in Fire is an American reality television competition series that has aired on the History channel since its season one premiere episode on June 22, 2015 and is produced by Outpost Entertainment.

The program places four competitors in three elimination rounds to forge bladed weapons. Each weapon is tested and evaluated by a panel of three (sometimes four) judges. As the host for seasons one through seven, Wil Willis introduced the parameters for each episode. Grady Powell replaced Willis for season eight onward. The main judges include Historic Weapons Re-creation Specialist David Baker, Edged Weapon Specialist Doug Marcaida, American Bladesmith Society (ABS) Master Bladesmith James Neilson, and two-time Forged in Fire champion Ben Abbott.

Neilson missed most of season three due to hand surgery. ABS Master Bladesmith Jason Knight filled in for him from episode three of that season through episode seven of season four. Neilson briefly returned for the first episode of season four (a special with Knight, Baker, and Marcaida) before returning for good in episode eight until Abbott took over for the final three episodes. Since then, Neilson and Abbott have shared judging duties into season eight. Also during season four, Marcaida injured his right rotator cuff while testing a weapon. Marcaida's younger brother RJ and Kali students filled in for weapons testing while he recovered from the injury.

Series overview

Episodes

Season 1 (2015)

Season 2 (2016)

Season 3 (2016–2017)

Season 4 (2017)

Season 5 (2018) 
Season five's episode numbering starts at zero.

Season 6 (2019)

Season 7 (2019–2020)

Season 8 (2020–2022) 
Grady Powell replaced Wil Willis as host at the beginning of season 8.

Season 9 (2022)

Specials

Forged in Fire

Forged in Fire: Best of & Championship Weapons 
On November 24, 2021, a "Best of..." (BO) sequence was started with season 8's "Bladesgiving" episode and continued into season 9. 

In the "Championship..." series, Dave Baker presents his favorite weapons (various types and origins) featured in championship rounds from previous episodes.

Forged in Fire: Cutting Deeper

Forged in Fire: Meet the Judges

See also 
 Forged in Fire accolades
 Notable contestant achievements
 List of martial arts weapons
 Weapon

References

External links 
  at history.com
 
  at next-episode.net

Forged in Fire